Holly J. Humphrey is the president of the Josiah Macy Jr. Foundation and the Ralph W. Gerard Emeritus Professor in Medicine at the University of Chicago's Pritzker School of Medicine.

Education 
In 1979, Humphrey graduated from North Central College summa cum laude.

Humphrey earned her MD from the University of Chicago with honors in 1983. She stayed at the University of Chicago for her residency in internal medicine, and fellowship in pulmonology and critical care medicine.

Career 

After completing her medical training Humphrey stayed on at the University of Chicago, joining the faculty as an Assistant Professor in 1989. That year, she and a colleague led the first White Coat Ceremony in the country at the University.

Humphrey was the director of the Pritzker School of Medicine's Internal Medicine residency program for 14 years.
Before joining the Macy Foundation, she spent 15 years as the Ralph W. Gerard Professor in Medicine and Dean for Medical Education at the University of Chicago. 

Humphrey joined the Macy Foundation in 2018. She is currently the Ralph W. Gerard Emeritus Professor in Medicine. She serves as the chair of the Kaiser Permanente Bernard J. Tyson School of Medicine’s board of directors. She previously served as chair of the American Board of Internal Medicine and of the American Board of Internal Medicine Foundation. She was a Visiting Professor at Harvard University, Johns Hopkins University, University of Pennsylvania, Washington University in St. Louis and Georgetown University. She has authored more than 60 academic publications.

Humphrey was elected to the National Academy of Medicine in 2020.

Personal life 
Humphrey is married to Duane Follman, a cardiologist.

References 

Pritzker School of Medicine alumni
University of Chicago faculty
American pulmonologists
Members of the National Academy of Medicine
North Central College alumni